The Perodua Kelisa is a city car from Malaysian automaker Perodua. It was launched in 2001 as the successor to the Perodua Kancil. The Kelisa was sold alongside the older Kancil, and both were eventually replaced by the Perodua Viva in 2007.

History
The Kelisa was, in all its releases, based on a fifth-generation Daihatsu Mira (L700), and is named after the arowana fish native to Malaysia (ikan kelisa).

As Perodua has sold its vehicles in the United Kingdom since 1997, the Kelisa was introduced into the country in 2002 as a replacement to the Nippa, a rebadged Kancil. Like its predecessor, the Kelisa was the cheapest new car on sale in the United Kingdom, starting at under £5,000.

In 2002, the Kelisa Limited Edition was launched distinguable by a two-tone paintwork, leather seats and leather wrapped steering wheel.

The Perodua Kelisa launched with three variants: EX, GX and EZ. When the facelift launched in 2003, the models remained the same: EX, GX and EZ. A limited edition Kelisa, based on the original variant, prominently sports two toned colored paintwork and minor interior modifications.

On 21 October 2003, Perodua launched the facelift to the Perodua Kelisa. differed from the pre-facelift model with a new front honeycomb grille, a new lower front bumper with amber front turn signal lights, a new lower rear bumper with reflector, a newside protector moulding, a new rear wiper, a center position roof antenna, new meter panel, new design sports rims for the EX model and new design wheel caps for the GX model. Pre-facelift models used 13" wheels while the facelift model used 14" wheels.

It was available in four colors: Kristal White, Sparkling Silver, Millenia Gold and Gemilang Blue. Throughout Spring 2004, Perodua replaced the EX variant with the 850 EX variant and rebranded the GX to 1000 GX and EX to 1000 EX.Other changes different gear ratios for the manual transmissions and overall dimensions/size.

The Limited Edition returned in 2004.

Between August and November 2004, Perodua launched the Kelisa SE (Special Edition). It was available with both manual (GXS) and automatic (EZS) transmissions. These special edition Kelisa's featured clear lens for the front and side fender mounted turn signals, front seats with fixed headrest, painted center cluster, leather wrapped steering wheel and a bodykit consisting of a rear spoiler, side, front and rear skirts.

In 2006, Perodua launched the Kelisa Imago. It was available with both manual (GXQ) and automatic (EZQ) transmissions. The changes compared to the other Kelisa variants included a silver painted center cluster (including astray), leather seats with "imago" embroidery, leather-wrapped steering wheel, clear side and front turn signals, sporty spoiler, chrome door handles & door lock and a modern Metallic Pearl Jade finish — a light double metallic color.

The SE and Imago editions used the same alloy wheel designs as the regular EZ variant and do note that non-SE and Imago Kelisa's had yellow lenses for the front and side fender-mounted turn signals.

In February 2007, selected Kelisa models also came with built in Bluetooth technology.

List of Models

Malaysia 
Throughout the Kelisa's production run, various models were known under various other model names. However, these other names were mainly only used in marketing (price lists, brochures, stickers on the boot and more) as the vehicles actually registration paper would contain the actual model name.

Colors

Specifications 

While the seat fabric was shared between pre-facelift GX and EZ variants, post-facelift GX and EZ variants each had unique fabric upholstery with unique fabric patterns.

In media
In the second series of Top Gear, James May drove the Kelisa and was generally impressed with the car, even likening it to the original Mini. However, in Jeremy Clarkson's 2005 DVD Heaven and Hell, Clarkson bought a Perodua Kelisa EX and destroyed it by blowing it up immediately after purchasing it, in an effort to highlight aesthetic frustrations with the design.

In April 2007, Clarkson described it as the worst in the world: "Its name was like a disease and suggested it was built in jungles by people who wear leaves for shoes." His comments drew criticism from the Malaysian Government, a representative of which countered by stating that no complaints had been received from any customers in the United Kingdom.

Awards and accolades 

 ASEAN Auto Car Awards 2003/2004 (Compact Car category)
 NST - MasterCard Compact Car of the Year 2003
 NST Car of the Year 2002.

References

City cars
Kelisa
Cars introduced in 2001